Circus (stylised as CIRCUS) is the debut studio album by Japanese musician and actress Chiaki Kuriyama, which was released on March 16, 2011. Kuriyama collaborated with famous Japanese and overseas rock musicians to create the album. In January 2012, the album was re-released as a deluxe edition, featuring the single "Tsukiyo no Shōzō" and its B-side "Seishun no Matataki""

Background and development 

Kuriyama made her musical debut in early 2010, with the single "Ryūsei no Namida" that was used as the theme song for the anime Mobile Suit Gundam Unicorn. Her next two singles were also used for anime: "Kanōsei Girl" (2010) was used as the third opening theme song for Yorinuki Gintama-san and "Cold Finger Girl" as the opening theme song for Level E.

After "Ryūsei no Namida", Kuriyama wanted to collaborate with many of her favourite musicians. She was asked by her musical director to draw up a list of her favourite musicians, and her staff asked them if they wanted to write music for Kuriyama. All of the musicians on the list accepted. From her second single, "Kanōsei Girl", Kuriyama began collaborating with famous rock musicians on her singles. "Kanōsei Girl" was produced by Tomoyasu Hotei, while "Cold Finger Girl" was produced by Kenichi Asai, and "Oishii Kisetsu" / "Ketteiteki Sanpunkan" by Ringo Sheena.

Writing and production 

In addition to the single songs, all the tracks on the album were produced by famous rock musicians. "Roulette de Kuchizuke o" was written by Takuro Sugawara and Yoshimitsu Taki of the band 9mm Parabellum Bullet, "Mirai no Hikari" by Does member Wataru Ujihara and Ryō Eguchi of Stereo Fabrication of Youth fame. "Shinkai" was written by Atsushi Sakurai and Hidehiko Hoshino from the band Buck-Tick, "Gokoku Hōjō Rock" was written and produced by Theatre Brook vocalist Taiji Satō and "New Moon Day" by Tōru Hidaka, former member of Beat Crusaders and Monobright. Two songs were written by overseas rock musicians: "Kuchi ni Shita Love" was produced by Australian band Jet members Chris Cester and Mark Wilson, and "Ladies & Gentlemen" by Third Eye Blind members Stephan Jenkins and Kryz Reid. Both songs featured lyrics by Junji Ishiwatari, a member of the band Supercar and a famous producer.

Hidaka was inspired by "Kanōsei Girl" to write a glam rock song for Kuiryama. Ujihara was asked to make a song for Kuriyama in the "fast-paced style" of the songs he writes for Does.

"Tsukiyo no Shōzō" and "Seishun no Matataki" were recorded after the album's release, when Kuriyama was feeling more confident as a vocalist. She felt that adding these to songs to the deluxe edition the album more balance.

The album title refers to the great variety of songs found on the album.

Critical reception 

Kazuhiro "Scao" Ikeda of EMTG praised the album, feeling as if Kuriyama was being an actress, taking on the roles set for her by each musician. He praised "Roulette de Kuchizuke o" for its "thudding, edgy sound" and thrilling 1970s pop-style dramaticness. He described "Oishii Kisetsu" as "bewitching and cute", and praised "Ketteiteki Sanpunkan"'s "noisy and suspicious atmosphere", and found "Kanōsei Girl"'s "sprinting and rising feelings...liberating". CDJournal reviewers believed the album was "edgy and personal", and praised Kuriyama for having a natural vocal sense.

Commercial reception 

The album debuted at number 19 on Oricon's weekly album charts, and remained in the top 300 for five weeks. When the album was re-released in 2012, it reached number 86, and charted for another two weeks. Cumulatively, the album has sold 12,000 copies.

Track listing

Chart rankings

Sales and certifications

Release history

References 

2011 debut albums
Japanese-language albums
Defstar Records albums